
This is a complete list of school districts of in the state of Washington.

A
Aberdeen School District 5
Adna School District 226
Almira School District 17
Anacortes School District 103
Arlington School District 16
Asotin-Anatone School District 420
Auburn School District 408

B
Bainbridge Island School District 303
Battle Ground School District 119
Bellevue School District 405
Bellingham School District 501
Benge School District 122
Bethel School District 403
Bickleton School District 203
Blaine School District 503
Boistfort School District 234
Bremerton School District 100-C
Brewster School District 111
Bridgeport School District 75
Brinnon School District 46
Burlington-Edison School District 100

C
Camas School District 117
Cape Flattery School District 401
Carbonado School District 19
Cascade School District 228
Cashmere School District 222
Castle Rock School District 401
Centerville School District 215
Central Kitsap School District 401
Central Valley School District 356
Centralia School District 401
Chehalis School District 302
Cheney School District 360
Chewelah School District 36
Chimacum School District 49
Clarkston School District 250
Cle Elum-Roslyn School District 404
Clover Park School District 400
Colfax School District 300
College Place School District 250
Colton School District 306
Columbia School District (Stevens) 206
Columbia School District (Walla Walla) 400
Colville School District 115
Concrete School District 11
Conway Consolidated School District 317
Cosmopolis School District 99
Coulee-Hartline School District 151
Coupeville School District 204
Crescent School District 313
Creston School District 73
Curlew School District 50
Cusick School District 59

D
Damman School District 7
Darrington School District 330
Davenport School District 207
Dayton School District 2
Deer Park School District 
Dieringer School District 343
Dixie School District (Washington) 101

E
East Valley School District (Yakima) 90
East Valley School District (Spokane) 361
Eastmont School District 206
Easton School District 28
Eatonville School District 404
Edmonds School District 15
Ellensburg School District 401
Elma School District 68
Endicott School District 308
Entiat School District 127
Enumclaw School District 216
Ephrata School District 165
Evaline School District 36
Everett School District 2
Evergreen School District (Clark) 114
Evergreen School District (Stevens)

F
Federal Way School District 210
Ferndale School District 502
Fife Public Schools 417
Finley School District 53
Franklin Pierce School District 402
Freeman School District 358

G
Garfield School District 302
Glenwood School District 401
Goldendale School District 404
Grand Coulee Dam School District 301
Grandview School District 200
Granger School District 204
Granite Falls School District 332
Grapeview School District 54
Great Northern School District 312
Green Mountain School District 103
Griffin School District 324

H
Harrington School District 204
Highland School District 203
Highline School District 401
Hockinson School District 98
Hood Canal School District 404
Hoquiam School District 28

I
Inchelium School District 70
Index School District 63
Issaquah School District 411

J

K
Kahlotus School District 56
Kalama School District 402
Keller School District 3
Kelso School District 458
Kennewick School District 17
Kent School District 415
Kettle Falls School District 212
Kiona-Benton City School District 52
Kittitas School District 403
Klickitat School District

L
La Center School District 101
LaConner School District 311
LaCrosse School District
Lake Chelan School District 129
Lake Stevens School District 4
Lake Washington School District 414
Lakewood School District 306
Lamont School District 264
Liberty School District 362
Lind School District 158
Longview Public Schools 122
Loon Lake School District 183
Lopez School District
Lyle School District 406
Lynden School District 504

M
Mabton School District 120
Mansfield School District 207
Manson School District 19
Mary M Knight School District 311
Mary Walker School District 207
Marysville School District 25
McCleary School District 65
Mead School District 354
Medical Lake School District 326
Mercer Island School District 400
Meridian School District 505
Methow Valley School District 350
Mill A School District 31
Monroe School District 103
Montesano School District 66
Morton School District 214
Moses Lake School District 161
Mossyrock School District 206
Mount Adams School District 209
Mount Baker School District 507
Mount Pleasant School District 29
Mount Vernon School District 320
Mukilteo School District 6

N
Naches Valley School District 3
Napavine School District 14
Naselle-Grays River Valley School District 155
Nespelem School District 14
Newport School District 56
Nine Mile Falls School District 325
Nooksack Valley School District 506
North Beach School District
North Franklin School District 51
North Kitsap School District 400
North Mason School District 403
North River School District 200
North Thurston Public Schools 3
Northport School District 211
Northshore School District 417

O
Oak Harbor School District 201
Oakesdale School District 324
Oakville School District 400
Ocean Beach School District 101
Ocosta School District 172
Odessa School District 105
Okanogan School District 105
Olympia School District 111
Omak School District 19
Onalaska School District 300
Onion Creek School District 30
Orcas Island School District 137
Orchard Prairie School District 123
Orient School District 65
Orondo School District 13
Oroville School District 410
Orting School District 344
Othello School District 147

P
Palisdes School District 102
Palouse School District 301
Pasco School District 1
Pateros School District 122
Paterson School District 50
Pe Ell School District 301
Peninsula School District 401
Pioneer School District 402
Pomeroy School District 110
Port Angeles School District 121
Port Townsend School District 50
Prescott School District 402
Prosser School District 116
Pullman School District 267
Puyallup School District 3

Q
Queets-Clearwater School District 20
Quilcene School District 48
Quillayute Valley School District 402
Quinault School District 97
Quincy School District 144

R
Rainier School District 307
Raymond School District 116
Reardan-Edwall School District 9
Renton School District 403
Republic School District 309
Richland School District 400
Ridgefield School District 122
Ritzville School District 160
Riverside School District 416
Riverview School District 407
Rochester School District 401
Roosevelt School District 403
Rosalia School District 320
Royal School District 160

S
Saint John School District 322
San Juan Island School District 149
Satsop School District 104
Seattle Public Schools 1
Sedro-Woolley School District 101
Selah School District 119
Selkirk School District 70
Sequim School District 323
Shaw Island School District 10
Shelton School District 309
Shoreline School District 412
Skamania School District 2
Skykomish School District 404
Snohomish School District 201
Snoqualmie Valley School District 410
Soap Lake School District 156
South Bend School District 118
South Kitsap School District 402
South Whidbey School District 206
Southside School District (Washington) 42
Spokane Public Schools 81
Sprague School District 8
Stanwood-Camano Island School District 401
Star School District 54
Starbuck School District 35
Stehekin School District
Steilacoom Historical School District
Steptoe School District 304
Stevenson-Carson School District 303
Sultan School District
Summit Valley School District
Sumner School District 320
Sunnyside School District 201

T
Tacoma Public Schools 10
Taholah School District 77
Tahoma School District 409
Tekoa School District 265
Tenino School District 402
Thorp School District 400
Toledo School District 237
Tonasket School District
Toppenish School District 202
Touchet School District 300
Toutle Lake School District
Trout Lake School District 400
Tukwila School District 406
Tumwater School District 33

U
Union Gap School District 2
University Place School District 83

V
Valley School District 70
Vancouver School District 37
Vashon Island School District 402

W
Wahkiakum School District 200
Wahluke School District 73
Waitsburg School District 401
Walla Walla School District 140
Wapato School District 207
Warden School District 146
Washington School for the Blind ?
Washington School for the Deaf ?
Washougal School District 112
Washtucna School District 109
Waterville School District 209
Wellpinit School District 49
Wenatchee School District 246
West Valley School District (Spokane) 363
West Valley School District (Yakima) 208
White Pass School District 303
White River School District 416
White Salmon Valley Schools 405
Wilbur School District 200
Willapa Valley School District 160
Wilson Creek School District 167
Winlock School District 232
Wishkah Valley School 117
Wishram School District 94
Woodland School District 404

Y
Yakima School District 7
Yelm School District

Z
Zillah School District 205

See also
Rural school districts in Washington

References

External links
A map of Washington school districts hosted by the Superintendent of Public Instruction.
greatschools.net summary

School districts
Washington